Pietro Barozzi (1441 - 1507) was an Italian Catholic and humanist bishop.

Biography 
Son of the senator Ludovico, began to study Latin and Greek letters with his companions Pietro Delfino and Leonardo Loredan, all pupils of the master Pierleone Leoni, then he studied at the University of Padua where he graduated in jurisprudence. In 1471 he was bishop of Belluno and in 1487 Bishop of Padua later.

He devoted particular attention to architectural studies, which he put into practice in rearranging and decorating public and ecclesiastical structures, influenced by the style of  Alberti. Among his works was the frescoed chapel of Santa Maria degli Angeli.

In recent times he is considered influential in humanism, Hubert Jedin describes him as an exemplary bishop.

For his initiative the Monte di Pietà was established in Padua.
Between 1500 and 1506 he was the chancellor of the University of Padua.

He died in 1507. The erudite bishop Pietro Barozzi left a large collection of juridical, theological works, of Greek, Latin and vulgar classics humanist authors, some manuscript was emigrated to England.

References

Sources

External links 

Pietro
16th-century Venetian people